A flower bouquet is a collection of flowers in a creative arrangement.  Flower bouquets can be arranged for the decor of homes or public buildings, or may be handheld.  Handheld bouquets are classified by several different popular shapes and styles, including nosegay, crescent, and cascading bouquets. Flower bouquets are often given for special occasions such as birthdays, anniversaries or funerals. They are also used extensively in weddings as well as Olympics Medal Ceremonies. Bouquets arranged in vases or planters for home decor can be arranged in either traditional or modern styles. Symbolism may be attached to the types of flowers used, according to the culture.

History

The arrangement of flowers for home or building decor has a long history throughout the world. The oldest evidence of formal arranging of bouquets in vases comes from ancient Egypt, and depictions of flower arrangements date to the Old Kingdom (~2500 BCE). The sacred lotus was often used, as were herbs, palms, irises, anemones, and narcissus.

In some cultures, ancient practises still survive today, for example in ikebana, the art of flower-arranging that comes from Japan. The oldest known book on flower-arranging is Japanese and dates from 1445. Simplicity and linear form are core features of ikebana, which has had a great influence on Western flower arranging since the late 19th century.

Flower-arranging as an art form was brought to Japan by Buddhist monks, who learned it while in China. In ancient China, flower-arranging developed into a highly refined art form, based on the principle that life is sacred, including the life of plants, therefore cut flowers were used sparingly in carefully planned arrangements. Flowers were a traditional ritual offering among Buddhists, however, and remain so.
 
In Europe, flower arranging as a formal art was first documented among the Dutch, who "in particular, painted wonderful informal arrangements of flowers [...] In the 18th century, arrangements were used to decorate the houses of the wealthy families and the aristocracy."

Flower symbolism is common in many cultures, and can be complex.  In China, certain flowers symbolize seasons: white plum blossoms represent winter, peach and cherry blossoms represent spring, lotus represents summer, and chrysanthemums the fall.

Nosegay

The term "tussie-mussie" is sometimes used interchangeably with nosegay. A nosegay was also known as a "talking bouquet" or "flower poesy" during the Victorian era, when they became a popular gift.  Traditionally, brides will also carry a small nosegay.  Tussie mussies were introduced to England in the early 18th century, and were a fashionable accessory for young women by the early 19th century. A tussie mussie is a small circular bouquet like a nosegay, but carries symbolic meaning based upon the language of flowers, where particular flowers represent specific sentiments. They were commonly exchanged by lovers, who sent messages to one another based upon the flowers used in the bouquet. Traditionally, tussie mussies are arranged in a cone- or cornucopia-shaped container, made of tin or silver, with a chain attached for carrying the bouquet.

Language of flowers

Flower symbolism originated in Asia and the Middle East, where certain flowers, such as the lotus, were considered sacred, or at least to be associated with spiritual themes.  This was often reflected in artwork, for example the use of bamboo in Chinese art to represent longevity and eternity. The language of flowers was introduced to England in the early 18th century by Mary Wortley, Lady Montague, whose husband was Ambassador to Turkey. By the Victorian era, almost every flower had a specific meaning attached to it. Small nosegay or "tussie mussie" bouquets might include chamomile flowers, which a woman might send to a romantic interest to tell him "Patience"; goldenrod represented indecision.

Wedding bouquets
Traditionally the bride will hold the bouquet, and the maid of honor will hold it during the ceremony. After the wedding the bride will toss it over her shoulder, and it is believed that whoever catches the bouquet is the next in line to be married. This practice may be related to the Golden Apple of Discord myth.

Wedding bouquet shapes
There are many different bridal bouquet styles from which to select. Brides typically choose the shape of their bouquets according to popular trends at the time of their wedding, however some choose bouquets which evoke another time period. While the language of flowers can contribute to a message to be conveyed about the couple, the shapes are a personal preference.

The Posy bouquet is typically round in shape and is thought of as modern due to the small size and relative simplicity of the arrangement. It is also popular for the ease of carrying and passing-off during the ceremony. It can be composed of an expensive flower, such as a rose, or can be a sampling of country flowers.

The Cascading bouquet is usually a large arrangement which tapers near the bottom. It was popularized as the arrangement of choice for the 1980s at the wedding of Lady Diana Spencer and the Prince of Wales at Westminster Abbey. It can, and is often, made up of many types of flowers and is enhanced with Baby's Breath and different types of greenery, such as ivy. This bouquet became less popular as bridal trends shifted towards simplicity, however it has found a resurgence in recent years.

The Presentation bouquet saw a surge in popularity at the turn of the twentieth century. It is most frequently composed of a long-stemmed bud, such as the Calla Lily, and is cradled in the bride's arms, rather than carried by the stems.

The following gallery shows popular bride's bouquet shapes, including cascading, hand-tied, nosegay, pomander, flower spray and Biedermeier.

See also

Floral design
Boutonnière
Corsage
Festoon
Garland
Wreath
Vegetable bouquet

References

Fashion accessories
Floristry
Flowers in culture
Wedding dresses